The National Judicial Council (NJC), is an executive body established by the Federal Government of Nigeria in accordance with the provisions of Section 153 of the 1999 Constitution as amended to protect the Judiciary of Nigeria from the whims and caprices of the Executive.

The Chairman of Council is the Chief Justice of Nigeria, Hon. Olukayode Ariwoola, while the deputy chairman is Hon Justice Musa Dattijo Muhammad, justice of the Supreme Court. Other members are: The President of the Court of Appeal, four retired Justices of the Supreme Court, a retired President of the Court of Appeal, President of National Industrial Court, Chief Judge of the Federal High Court, Chief Judge of the High Court FCT, Chief Judges of High Court of four states, President of Customary Court of Appeal, Grand Khadi of Sharia Court of Appeal, President of the Nigerian Bar Association, a former President of the Nigeria Bar Association, three members of the Nigeria Bar Association, and two retired Public Servant. The present Secretary of Council is Ahmed Gambo Saleh, Esq.

Statutory duties
The NJC perform several judicial functions such as advising the President of Nigeria and Governors on issues related to the judiciary.
They also perform disciplinary functions as well as appointment and nomination of executive members of the Judicial.

See also
Nigerian Body of Benchers

References

Law of Nigeria